The Elandsgracht bus station is a bus station for regional transport, on the corner of Marnixstraat and Elandsgracht on the western side of the center of Amsterdam. The bus station was known as Marnixstraat bus station until December 2014.

History
The bus station was built in 1957 on the site of the former Appeltjesmarkt, a fruit and vegetable market on the edge of the Jordaan neighborhood. The bus station was known as Marnixstraat bus station.

Lines 
The following lines have their terminus at the bus station itself:

Outside the bus station are stops for the following tram and bus lines:

See also
Amsterdam Centraal station
Schiphol Busnet

References

Transport in Amsterdam